These are things named after Jacques Hadamard (1865–1963), a French mathematician.  (For references, see the respective articles.)

Theorems, lemmas, and conjectures 
Many of these results are sometimes called "Hadamard's theorem".
 Cartan–Hadamard theorem, a statement in Riemannian geometry concerning the structure of complete Riemannian manifolds of non-positive sectional curvature
 Cartan–Hadamard conjecture, an open problem in Riemannian geometry and geometric measure theory concerning the generalization of the classical isoperimetric inequality  to spaces of nonpositive sectional curvature
 Cauchy–Hadamard theorem, a statement in complex analysis describing the radius of convergence of a power series
 Hadamard's inequality, a bound on the determinant of a matrix whose entries are complex numbers in terms of the lengths of its column vectors
 Hermite–Hadamard inequality, a bound on the mean value of a convex function in an interval in terms of the value it takes at the mid-point and ends of interval
 Hadamard's lemma, a result closely related to the first-order term in Taylor's theorem
 Ostrowski–Hadamard gap theorem concerning the analytic continuation of complex power series
 Hadamard three-circle theorem, concerning the maxima of holomorphic functions within concentric circles in the complex plane.
 Hadamard three-lines theorem, concerning the maxima of holomorphic functions defined in regions bounded by parallel lines in the complex plane.

Mathematical objects and definitions 

 Hadamard product:
 entry-wise matrix multiplication
 an infinite product expansion for the Riemann zeta function
 Hadamard code
 Hadamard's dynamical system
 Hadamard manifold
 Hadamard matrix
 Hadamard space
 Hadamard Transform and Hadamard gate
 Hadamard variance

Equations, problems, and methods 
 Hadamard–Rybczynski equation
 Hadamard's maximal determinant problem
 Hadamard's method of descent
 Hadamard regularization

External links 
 Encyclopedia of Math: Hadamard theorem

Hadamard